Governor Stokes may refer to:

Edward C. Stokes (1860–1942), 32nd Governor of New Jersey
Gabriel Stokes (1849–1920), Acting Governor of Madras in 1906
Luke Stokes (fl. 1630s–1650s), Governor of Nevis from 1634 to 1635 and from 1649 to in 1656
Montfort Stokes (1762–1842), 25th Governor of North Carolina